Can't Slow Down is the second solo studio album by American recording artist Lionel Richie. It was released on October 11, 1983, by Motown Records. It has been certified Diamond by the RIAA, selling over 10 million copies in the United States and over 20 million copies worldwide, making it Richie's best-selling album, and one of the best-selling albums of the 1980's.

Five singles were released from Can't Slow Down, all of which hit the top ten of the Billboard Hot 100 chart, including two that reached No. 1: "All Night Long (All Night)" and "Hello". The album subsequently won the Grammy Award for Album of the Year in 1985.

Critical reception 

In a contemporary review for The Village Voice, music critic Robert Christgau gave the album a "B+" and called it a "surprisingly solid" improvement, particularly with respect to Richie's ballad singing. He felt that its "jumpy international dance-pop" suited Richie more than the Commodores' funk had and predicted that, considering his "well-established appeal to white people," Can't Slow Down had the potential to become a "mini-Thriller". Don Shewey of Rolling Stone magazine gave the album four out of five stars and said that, although the ballads were monotonous, Richie successfully broadened his music for different listeners and drew on contemporary artists such as Stevie Wonder and Michael Jackson: "if you can't innovate, imitate. And the more honest they are about their sources, the better."

In a retrospective review for AllMusic, Stephen Thomas Erlewine gave it four-and-a-half out of five stars and wrote that Richie took a conservative, melodic hook-based approach on an album whose hits showed him at his best and whose only weakness was a short running time. In 1999, Q magazine included Can't Slow Down on its list of the best Motown records of all time and stated, "Production values are high, his songwriting craft is at its peak and at least one track – the global smash 'All Night Long' – is an anthem to good times that makes the heart sing and feet twitch".

Commercial performance and re-releases 
The album reached No. 1 on the Billboard album chart. It also spent 59 consecutive weeks inside the Top 10 (including the entire year of 1984) and a total of 160 weeks (over three years) on the Billboard 200. After being the third best-selling album of 1984, it went on to win a Grammy Award for Album of the Year in 1985, beating out such heavyweight contenders as Born in the U.S.A. by Bruce Springsteen and Purple Rain by Prince. By 1986 the album had sold 15 million copies, eventually selling over 20 million.

Can't Slow Down achieved the feat of having every single released hit the top ten on the Billboard Hot 100 chart. Two songs, "Hello" and "All Night Long (All Night)", both went to #1. Other hits include "Stuck on You" (US #3), "Running With the Night" (US #7), and "Penny Lover" (US #8).  The ballad "The Only One" was a significant song from the album which was never released as a single, yet remains a popular staple of Richie's live performances.

The single "Stuck on You" also reached No. 24 on the Billboard Hot Country Singles & Tracks chart (now Hot Country Songs).

On May 6, 2003, a two-CD deluxe edition of the album was released in conjunction of the 20th anniversary of the album's original release date. This version included several mixes originally included on various singles from the album at the end of the first CD, including instrumental versions of the 12-inch extended mixes of "All Night Long (All Night)" and "Running with the Night". Disc 2 showcased demo or alternate versions of all tracks from the original album, plus additional unfinished songs from the same sessions, all previously unreleased.

Track listing

Personnel 
Credits lifted from the album's liner notes.

Performers and musicians

 Lionel Richie – lead vocals, vocal arrangements, rhythm arrangements (2–4, 6–8), backing vocals (2-7), Yamaha GS-1 (2–4), acoustic piano (8)
 David Cochrane – synthesizers (1), synthesizer programming (1), vocoder (1), synth bass (1), guitars (1, 5), arrangements (1), backing vocals (2, 5, 7)
 Greg Phillinganes – Yamaha GS-1 (2, 5), synthesizers (5), rhythm arrangements (5)
 Michael Boddicker – synthesizers (3, 4, 7, 8), E-mu Emulator sampler (4), additional synthesizer (5), vocoder (7)
 John Hobbs – Fender Rhodes (3), electric piano (7)
 Brian Banks – synthesizer programming (5)
 Anthony Marinelli – synthesizer programming (5)
 David Foster – keyboards (6), Roland Jupiter 8 (6), Moog bass (6), rhythm arrangements (6)
 Reginald "Sonny" Burke – Fender Rhodes (8)
 Darrell Jones – guitars (2), acoustic guitar (4), electric guitar (8)
 Tim May – guitars (2), acoustic guitar (8)
 Carlos Rios – guitars (3, 7)
 Mitch Holder – guitars (4)
 Louie Shelton – guitars (4, 8)
 Fred Tackett – acoustic guitar (4)
 Steve Lukather – guitars (6), guitar solo (7)
 Peter Banks – guitars (8) [uncredited]
 Abraham Laboriel – bass guitar (2, 3)
 Joe Chemay – bass guitar (4, 7, 8)
 Nathan East – bass guitar (5)
 Paul Leim – Simmons drums (1), drums (3, 4, 8)
 John Robinson – drums (2, 6)
 Jeff Porcaro – drums (7)
 Paulinho da Costa – percussion (2, 7)
 Charlie Loper – trombone (2)
 Bill Reichenbach Jr. – trombone (2)
 Chuck Findley – trumpet (2)
 Gary Grant – trumpet (2)
 Jerry Hey – trumpet (2)
 James Anthony Carmichael – arrangements (1), horn arrangements (2), string arrangements (2–4, 8), rhythm arrangements (3–5, 7, 8)
 Jeremy Lubbock – string arrangements (6)
 Israel Baker – concertmaster (3, 4, 6)
 Harry Bluestone – concertmaster (8)
 Melinda Joyce Chatman – vocal sound effects (2)
 Calvin Harris – backing vocals (2)
 Richard Marx – backing vocals (2, 5–7)
 Deborah Thomas – backing vocals (2, 5, 7)
 Kin Vassy – backing vocals (2)
 Jeanette Hawes – backing vocals (6)

Chant vocals on "All Night Long"

 Diane Burt
 James Anthony Carmichael
 Melinda Joyce Chatman
 David Cochrane 
 Dr. Lloyd Byro Greig 
 Calvin Harris
 Jeanette Hawes 
 Janice Marie Johnson 
 Brenda Harvey-Richie 
 Richard Marx
 Deborah Joyce Richie
 Lionel Richie
 Suzanne Stanford
 Deborah Thomas

Hoopa Hollers on "All Night Long"

 Marilyn Ammons 
 Sue Ann Butler
 Melinda Joyce Chatman
 Sheldon J. Cohn, Esq.
 Sandy Dent-Crimmel 
 Ruth Diaz 
 David Egerton 
 Sylvia Genauer
 Rejauna Lynn Green 
 Gabrielle Greig 
 Sally Greig
 Tanya Greig
 Darrell Jones
 David Malvin
 Alison Maxwell
 Jerry Montes 
 John Michael Montes
 Billy "Bass" Nelson
 Greg Phillinganes
 Carlos Rios 
 Suzanne Stanford 
 Randy Stern 
 Wilbert Terrell 
 Susan Wood

Production 

 James Anthony Carmichael – producer (1–5, 7, 8)
 Lionel Richie – producer (1–5, 7, 8)
 David Foster – producer (6)
 Brenda Harvey-Richie – production assistant 
 Melinda Joyce Chatman – production coordinator 
 Calvin Harris – recording and mixing engineer
 Steve Crimmel – second recording engineer (1–5, 7)
 David Egerton – second recording engineer (1–5, 7)
 Mark Ettel – second recording engineer (1–5, 7)
 Larry Ferguson – recording engineer (6)
 Humberto Gatica – recording and mixing engineer (6)
 Terry Christian – second recording engineer (6)
 Jim Cassell – second recording engineer (8)
 Jane Clark – additional engineer
 Fred Law – second mixing
 Karen Siegel – second mixing
 David Kraai – technical support
 Bernie Grundman – mastering at A&M Studios (Hollywood, California)
 Rita Leigh – creative assistant 
 Johnny Lee – art direction 
 Chris Callis – innerspread photography
 Greg Gorman – front and back cover photography

Charts

Weekly charts

Year-end charts

Decade-end charts

Certifications and sales

See also 
 List of best-selling albums
 List of best-selling albums in the United States

References 

1983 albums
Lionel Richie albums
Albums produced by David Foster
Albums produced by James Anthony Carmichael
Albums produced by Lionel Richie
Albums recorded at United Western Recorders
Albums recorded at Sunset Sound Recorders
Grammy Award for Album of the Year
Motown albums